Raphel may refer to:

Arnold Lewis Raphel (1943–1988), the 18th U.S. ambassador in Pakistan
Monique Raphel High, American author
Raphel Cherry (born 1961), former American football defensive back in the National Football League
Raphel Ortiz Huertas, Puerto Rican professional soccer player
Robin Raphel, career diplomat, Ambassador to Tunisia and Assistant Secretary of State for South Asian Affairs during the Clinton administration

See also
Raphèl maí amèche zabí almi